Synaphe interjunctalis is a species of moth of the family Pyralidae described by Achille Guenée in 1849. It is found in Portugal and Algeria.

References

Moths described in 1849
Pyralini